Rock Creek is a stream that flows from the high Eastern Sierra Nevada to the Owens River in Mono County of eastern California.  The upper watershed is in the John Muir Wilderness of the Sierra and Inyo National Forests.

Course
Rock Creek drains from the Sierra Crest near Bear Creek Spire.  Additional creek drainage is from the crest's Mount Abbot, Mount Mills, Ruby Peak, and Mount Starr. They combine with flow from Little Lakes Valley to Rock Creek Lake.

From the lake Rock Creek flows north to the location known as Tom's Place along U.S. Route 395, less than two miles from the Owens River.  The creek, however, turns southeast and flows parallel to the Owens River (and is shown on maps as "Lower Rock Creek"), eventually joining the river near the mouth of the Owens River Gorge.

Lower Rock Creek, below Tom's Place, flows an additional  to the Owens River.

See also
Bishop Creek (Inyo County)
Morgan Creek
List of California rivers

References

Rivers of Mono County, California
Rivers of the Sierra Nevada (United States)
Tributaries of the Owens River
Inyo National Forest
Sierra National Forest
Rivers of Northern California
Rivers of the Sierra Nevada in California